The Blenheim Blades are a Canadian junior ice hockey team based in Blenheim, Ontario.  They play in the Provincial Junior Hockey League of the Ontario Hockey Association and Hockey Canada.

History

The Blenheim Golden Blades were founded in 1965, but could not find a league to play in locally until 1967.  Until 1967, the Blades played an exhibition season against teams from Michigan in an American Junior B league until the OHA playoffs began.

In 1968, the Golden Blades joined the Border Cities Junior "B" Hockey League.  In 1971, the league was demoted and renamed the Great Lakes Junior "C" Hockey League.  In 1974, the team simplified their name to the "Blades".

The Blades have won a league title in their franchise history, the 1970 Border Cities Jr. D championship.

Being from a smaller community than a lot of centres in the Bill Stobbs Division, the Blades have often struggled, but in recent years have become a winning team that is tough to compete with.

The playoffs for the 2019-20 season were cancelled due to the COVID-19 pandemic, leading to the team not being able to play a single game.

Season-by-season record

2019-2020 team staff
President - Matthew Frain
General Manager - Bob Price
Assistant General Manager - Lonnie Hamilton
Director of Hockey Operations - Wayne Cowell
Director of Player Personal - Bill Saunders
Head coach - Brett Hope 
Assistant coach - Ryan Paxton
Assistant coach - Shawn Hope
Trainer and Equipment Manager - Stu Fletcher
Trainer - Jacob Fancy
Assistant Trainer - Aaron Jackson

Notable alumni
 Chris Allen
 Bob Gryp
 Ryan Jones
 Matt Martin
 Todd Warriner

External links
Blades webpage

Great Lakes Junior C Hockey League teams
1967 establishments in Ontario
Ice hockey clubs established in 1967